The Hoyt-Shedd Estate is a historic residential estate at 386-396 Andover Street and 569-579 East Merrimack Street in Lowell, Massachusetts. The houses at 386 and 396 Andover Street are large Stick style mansions, built about the same time (c. 1873) and designed by the same architect. They were built for the friends and business partners E. W. Hoyt and F. B. Shedd. Together they made a fortune selling perfume and related products.

The estate was listed on the National Register of Historic Places on May 17, 1984, and was included in the Andover Street Historic District on June 2, 2000.

See also
National Register of Historic Places listings in Lowell, Massachusetts

References

Houses on the National Register of Historic Places in Middlesex County, Massachusetts
Houses in Lowell, Massachusetts
Historic district contributing properties in Massachusetts
National Register of Historic Places in Lowell, Massachusetts
Queen Anne architecture in Massachusetts
Houses completed in 1878